The Catholic Church in the Kingdom of the Netherlands is organised into two ecclesiastical provinces: the Archdiocese of Utrecht for the Netherlands proper and Port of Spain for the Caribbean part of the Kingdom of the Netherlands.  Similarly, there are two episcopal conferences in the Kingdom, that of the Netherlands proper and that of Antilles in the Caribbean part of the Kingdom.

Ecclesiastical Province of the Netherlands 
In the Netherlands proper, there are 6 suffragan dioceses of the Metropolitan Archdiocese of Utrecht.
 Metropolitan Archdiocese of Utrecht 
Diocese of Breda
Diocese of Groningen-Leeuwarden
Diocese of Haarlem-Amsterdam
Diocese of Roermond
Diocese of Rotterdam
Diocese of 's-Hertogenbosch (Den Bosch)

Sui iuris Jurisdictions 
 Military Ordinariate of the Netherlands

Ecclesiastical province of Port of Spain 
In the Caribbean part of the Kingdom, the Church has a single diocese, the Diocese of Willemstad which is a suffragan of the Archdiocese of Port of Spain. Willemstad is part of the Antilles Episcopal Conference.

Overlapping foreign competence 
 Diocese of Saint-Vladimir-le-Grand de Paris for Eastern Catholics in France, Benelux etc.

 Former jurisdictions 
 Titular see 
 Diocese of Maastricht

 Other (excludes suppressed precursors with see-identical successors)

 Apostolic Vicariate of Batavia (Holland) (first as independent mission; not to be confused with its East Indies counterpart on Java)
 Diocese of Deventer 
 Diocese of Grave-Nijmegen 
 Diocese of Haarlem 
 Diocese of Leeuwarden 
 Apostolic Vicariate of Limburg 
 Diocese of Middelburg 
 Apostolic Vicariate of Ravenstein-Megen

External links and sources 
 Catholic-Hierarchy entry.
 GCatholic.org - here current page.

Catholic Church in the Kingdom of the Netherlands

Netherlands
Roman Catholic dioceses in the Netherlands
Catholic dioceses